Victor Meerovich Polterovich (born 27 December 1937) is a Russian economist. He was one of the leading figures in mathematical economics in the Soviet Union and post-Soviet Russia, and made several important contributions to general equilibrium theory.

Born in Moscow, he obtained a diploma in engineering from Gubkin Russian State University of Oil and Gas in 1962, before taking post-graduate courses at Moscow State University. After an invitation by Aron Katsenelinboigen, Polterovich joined the Central Economic Mathematical Institute in 1966. While remaining a "simple" research fellow, his research contributions gained international recognition. He was a member of the editorial board of the Journal of Mathematical Economics (1985–2009), and an associate editor of Econometrica (1989–95).

Selected publications

References 

1937 births
Living people
Soviet economists
20th-century Russian  economists
Economists from Moscow
Macroeconomists
Moscow State University alumni
Full Members of the Russian Academy of Sciences
Fellows of the Econometric Society
21st-century Russian economists